South Ripley is a rural locality and suburb of Ipswich in the City of Ipswich, Queensland, Australia. South Ripley is part of the Ecco Ripley urban development area.

Geography

As a locality, South Ripley is the valley created by Bundamba Creek, which runs in a north-south direction in the locality. Bundamba Lagoon is located in the south-east part of the locality.

History
South Ripley is situated in the Yugarabul traditional Indigenous Australian country of the Brisbane and surrounding regions.

Bundamba Upper State School opened on 2 February 1874. In 1909, it was renamed Ripley State School. It closed in 1930 due to low student numbers. It was at 1166-1176 Ripley Road.

 
Ripley Valley State School and Ripley Valley State Secondary College opened on 1 January 2020.

Amenities 
The Ipswich City Council operates a fortnightly mobile library service which visits Providence Parade.

Education 
Ripley Valley State School is a government primary (P-6) school for boys and girls at 110 Botany Drive. In 2020, its first year of operation, the school had an enrolment of 336 students with 26 teachers (24 full-time equivalent) and 20 non-teaching staff (13 full-time equivalent).

Ripley Valley State Secondary College is a government secondary (7-12) school for boys and girls on the corner of Providence Parade and Parkway Avenue. In 2020, its first year of operation, the school had an enrolment of 154 students in Years 7 and 8 (the only years of school initially offered) with 15 teachers and 16 non-teaching staff (13 full-time equivalent).

References

External links
 

City of Ipswich
Localities in Queensland